Sparganothis eulongicosta is a species of moth of the family Tortricidae. It is found in the United States in Connecticut, Louisiana, Mississippi, New Hampshire, New Jersey and Pennsylvania.

The wingspan is 16–28 mm.

References

Moths described in 2012
Sparganothis